Mykola Prostorov (born 1994, in Kherson, Ukraine) is a Ukrainian male trampoline gymnast and member of the national team. He is medalist of the World Games, European Games and European Championships.

References

1994 births
Living people
Ukrainian male trampolinists
Gymnasts at the 2015 European Games
Gymnasts at the 2019 European Games
European Games medalists in gymnastics
European Games silver medalists for Ukraine
Competitors at the 2017 World Games
Sportspeople from Kherson
World Games silver medalists
Gymnasts at the 2020 Summer Olympics
Olympic gymnasts of Ukraine